The 2013 Australian Youth Olympic Festival was the fifth edition of the Australian Youth Olympic Festival. It was held from 16–20 January 2013.

Participant nations
There were 30 teams that participated in the games. They were:

Events
In 2013, the AYOF had 18 disciplines. These were:

Rugby sevens

Men's

Playoffs

Women's

Playoffs

References

External links

Australian Olympic Committee

Australian Youth Olympic Festival
Australian Youth Olympic Festival
Australian Youth Olympic Festival

2013 festivals
2013 in youth sport